Resnik is a surname. Notable people with the surname include:

 David Resnik (born 1962), American bioethicist
 Frank E. Resnik (1928–1995), former CEO and Chairman of Phillip Morris USA
 Hollis Resnik (born 1955), American singer and actress
 Judith Resnik (1949–1986), American astronaut who died in the Space Shuttle Challenger disaster
 Michael Resnik (born 1938), philosopher of mathematics and decision theory
 Regina Resnik (1922–2013), American opera singer

See also
 Reznik
 Resnik (disambiguation)
 Resnick (surname)